Thongdy Amnouayphone (born 7 November 1976) is a Laotian runner who competed at the 1996 Summer Olympics in the 4 × 100 metres relay, being placed 8th in his heat without advancing to the second round. He was the flag bearer of Laos during the 1996 Summer Olympics opening ceremony.

References 

1976 births
Living people
Laotian male sprinters
Olympic athletes of Laos
Athletes (track and field) at the 1996 Summer Olympics
Athletes (track and field) at the 1994 Asian Games
Athletes (track and field) at the 1998 Asian Games
Asian Games competitors for Laos